Mediolanum Forum (originally the Forum di Assago, formerly the FilaForum and DatchForum) is an indoor sports arena that is located in Assago, a small town 3 km outside Milan, Italy. The arena has a seating capacity of 12,700 and is primarily used for basketball, ice hockey, tennis and live concerts.

The venue is the home ground of the EuroLeague and Italian Serie A professional basketball team AX Armani Exchange Milan. In January 2009, the arena changed its name to the current name of Mediolanum Forum, replacing the old name of DatchForum.

History 

The Forum of Assago was built by Giuseppe Cabassi and his son Luca in 1990. It was named in several different way due to different sponsorships during the years: from 1993 to 2006 it was named FilaForum, from 2006 to 2008 DatchForum and then, from 2009, MediolanumForum.

The venue is located in the big Milanofiori complex and it covers an area of 40,000 sqm. The layout of the rooms is organized on 4 superimposed levels below the stands of the central arena. There are also private panoramic rooms (called "SkyBox") on the top floor. The Forum received the 1994 European Prize for Architecture for sports venues awarded by the Italian National Olympic Committee and the Council of Europe. It is also one of two facilities in Italy, along with PalaLottomatica in Rome, to be part of the European Arenas Association network. 

For the 2014 Euroleague Final Four the venue has been renovated and the capacity increased from 11,500 to 12,700. It was again renovated in 2017, with new internal signs and new colors in the corridors of the rings, also including the reconstruction of the floor.

Entertainment events

Sports

The arena hosted the 1994 Men's World Ice Hockey Championships, the 2003 IIHF Continental Cup Superfinal of ice hockey (together with Lugano's Pista La Resega), WWE Raw and WWE SmackDown in 2007, and the 2009 World Amateur Boxing Championships.

Since 2011, the Forum has also been home to La Grande Sfida, the annual tennis exhibition event played every Christmas. The arena also hosted the  edition of the 2014 EuroLeague Final Four

Some matches of the 2018 FIVB Volleyball World Championship have been held at the venue. The venue hosted some group phase matches at the FIBA EuroBasket 2022 which the country hosted alongside Czech Republic in Prague, Georgia in Tbilisi and Germany in Berlin/Cologne.

It will be the figure skating and short track venue during the 2026 Winter Olympics.

See also
 List of tennis stadiums by capacity
 List of indoor arenas in Italy

References

External links

 

Basketball venues in Italy
Volleyball venues in Italy
Indoor arenas in Italy
Sports venues in Italy
Indoor ice hockey venues in Italy
Tennis venues in Italy
Sports venues in Milan
Sports venues completed in 1990
Pallacanestro Olimpia Milano
1990 establishments in Italy
1998 Davis Cup
Venues of the 2026 Winter Olympics